Abdul Jalilul Jabbar was the eleventh Sultan of Brunei. He ruled only for a year from 1659 to 1660. Later on, he was succeeded by his uncle Muhammad Ali.

See also
 List of Sultans of Brunei

References

17th-century Sultans of Brunei
Year of birth missing
Year of death missing